The Montserrat Reporter is the only newspaper published in Montserrat. The paper is published on a weekly basis and is owned by Montserrat Printing & Publishing Inc.

References

External links
The Montserrat Reporter

Montserratian culture
Newspapers published in North America